The Legend of La Llorona is a 2022 American Horror film directed by Patricia Harris Seeley and written by José Prendes, Cameron Larson and Patricia Harris Seeley. The film stars Autumn Reeser, Danny Trejo, Antonio Cupo and Zamia Fardiño. The film was released on January 7, 2022.

Plot 
Andrew and Carly Candlewood, along with their son Danny, travel from California to Mexico for a much needed vacation. The getaway is not what they think when tales of missing children along with the town legend of La Llorona soon encompassing their trip. La Llorona is described as an evil spirit of a distraught mother who lurks near the water's edge and strikes fear in the hearts of all who see her. The spirit begins to torment the Candlewood family and kidnaps Danny. Along with their resourceful taxi driver Jorge, the family races to save Danny. They must navigate the spirit's power along with cartel thugs that roam the countryside.

Cast 

 Autumn Reeser as Carly Candlewood
 Antonio Cupo as Andrew Candlewoodilm
 Danny Trejo as Jorge
 Nicolas Madrazo as Danny Candlewood
 Zamia Fardiño as Maria / La Llorona
 Angélica Lara as Veronica
 Edgar Wuotto as Pedro Pablo
 Fernanda Aguilar as Isabella
 Josh Zaharia as Eduardo

Release 
The Legend of La Llorona had a limited theater opening on January 7, 2022. On January 11, it was released on streaming.

Reception

References

External links 
 
 
 

2022 films
2022 horror films
American supernatural horror films
American ghost films
Films set in Mexico
2020s American films